The HKU School of Professional and Continuing Education (HKU SPACE) is a private post-secondary education institution in Hong Kong. The School is a private subsidiary of the publicly funded University of Hong Kong. The School specializes in professional education, as well as providing degree-awarding courses in partnership with overseas universities.

History
In the early 1950s, it became apparent that there was a need for further education opportunities in the colony. The findings of the Keswick Report (1952) and the Jennings-Logan Report (1953) provided recommendations to the colonial government to establish a new department aimed at providing adult-education programmes. On 21 May 1957, HKU established the Department of Extra-Mural Studies with an enrollment of 330 students. Part of the purpose of the Department was to develop and run courses to meet the needs of the growing colony of Hong Kong. These included library studies in response to the opening of the first library in the territory, and housing management to cope with the growing housing crises which plagued the colony in the 1960s.

The Department was renamed the School of Professional and Continuing Education in January 1992. This change elevated its status with relation to its parent organisation, giving it financial autonomy, and allowing it more freedom to make decisions related to the programmes out offered.

Locations
HKU SPACE operates out of a number of small locations spread across Hong Kong, currently:

Subsidiaries

HKU SPACE also oversees a number of subsidiary educational organisations, such as the HKU SPACE Community College (established in 2000), the HKU SPACE International College (established in 2003), and the HKU SPACE Po Leung Kuk Stanley Ho Community College (established in 2006).

International Partners
HKU SPACE has strategic partnership with universities globally that offer a number of part time and full time courses at HKU SPACE campuses across Hong Kong.

References

Universities in Hong Kong
Vocational education in Hong Kong